A Cricket in the Ear ( / Shturets v uhoto) is a Bulgarian comedy-drama film released in 1976, directed by Georgi K. Stoyanov, starring Pavel Popandov, Stefan Mavrodiev, Itzhak Fintzi, Tatyana Lolova and Petar Slabakov.

A comedy with a spice of drama about two young men who live in the country but decide to move to the big city. All the travel turns into a reason for consideration and giving a new meaning to their past and future life. Do they finally arrive in the big city or come back to their village?

Plot
Evtim (Popandov) and Pesho (Mavrodiev), two young men, decided to leave their native village and move to the big city. They bring with them  big stuff from the home household goods but also their good intentions and uncertainty. Both of them carry some remorses too. Evtim because of the scandal with his older brother and Pesho because of leaving the home with not a notice to his parents. Standing by the road, amid a heap of luggage, they turned to be a colorful view as hitch-hikers to the passing vehicles. But so, the two friends have an opportunity to meet the variety of life. They see generous sympathy but also the selfishness; they see the exciting waves of the true love but also the repulsive duplicity. This meetings, in its own way, form their realization about the substantial milestones in the path of life.

Production
Production company:
Studio of Featured Films (SFF) - a Film Unit SREDETS
Working title: The Three Whishes 

Director:Georgi K. Stoyanov
Writer: Nikola Rusev
Director of Photography: Ivaylo Trenchev
Music: Kiril Donchev

Filmed: 1975; Premiere: 30.April.1976 

The film was released on DVD in 2000s.

Cast
Pavel Popandov as Evtim - the young man 1
Stefan Mavrodiev as Pesho - the young man 2
Tatyana Lolova as Vlastnata
Itzhak Fintzi as Gosho
Petar Slabakov as Cherniya
Stoyan Gadev as a truck driver
Elene Raynova as Toni
Evstati Stratev as Evtim's brother
Sotir Maynolovski 
Anton Radichev as a truck driver

Response
A reported 724,444 admissions were recorded for the film in cinemas throughout Bulgaria in the 70s.

There were the following publications:
Bulgarian Film Magazine, vol.6, 1975,p. 9 - by I. Ostrikov
Bulgarian Film Magazine, vol.8, 1975,p. 14/15 - by A. Svilenov
Film News Magazine, vol. 8-1975 - by A. Svilenov
New Films Magazine, vol.6-1975,p. 6/9 - by I. Akyov
FILM ART magazine, vol. 12,1975,p. 73 - by N. Rusev
Cinema Worker Magazine, vol.7-1979,p. 44/45 - by I. Hadzhiev

Awards
FBFF Varna'76 (Festival for Bulgarian Featured Films)
 Second Award for screenwriter Nikola Rusev, director Georgi K. Stoyanov and the actors Itzhak Fintzi and Stefan Mavrodiev

Notes

References
Galina Gencheva, Bulgarian Feature Films vol.3, Dr. Petar Beron 2008 with the Bulgarian Cinematheque
Bulgarian National Film Archive 
The film in the Bulgarian National Television database 
Details

External links
 

1970s Bulgarian-language films
1976 comedy-drama films
Bulgarian comedy-drama films
Films set in Bulgaria
Films shot in Bulgaria
1976 films